Lithobates is a genus of true frogs, of the family Ranidae. The name is derived from litho- (stone) and the Greek  (one that treads), meaning one that treads on rock, or rock climber.

The name was defined by Hillis and Wilcox (2005) for a subgenus of four Central and South American frogs within the genus Rana. The subgenus was subsequently expanded to seven species in Central and South America in a systematic revision of the genus Rana. The name was previously used by Frost et al. as a separate genus of ranid frogs that included most of the North American frogs traditionally included in the genus Rana, including the American bullfrog and northern leopard frog. Frost used the name in this sense in the frog section of a North American common names list edited by Crother (2008). This proposed change has since been rejected by others, such as Stuart (2008), Pauly et al. (2009), AmphibiaWeb, and Yuan et al. (2016). AmphibiaWeb, available at http://amphibiaweb.org/, an online compendium of amphibian names, follows Yuan et al. (2016) in recognizing Lithobates as a subgenus. On the other hand, Amphibian Species of the World 6.0, an online reference, uses Lithobates as a genus. This definition is also followed by, e.g., the International Union for Conservation of Nature (IUCN) and the Society for the Study of Amphibians and Reptiles.

Species
These species are recognised in the genus Lithobates:

Alternatively, if Lithobates is treated as a subgenus (neotropical true frogs), then this narrower definition would contain the following species:

References

 
True frogs
Amphibian genera
Amphibians of North America
Amphibians of Central America
Amphibians of South America
Taxa named by Leopold Fitzinger